Cotinis impia is a species of the Cotinis scarab genus.

References

Cetoniinae
Beetles of North America
Beetles described in 1905